María Elósegui Itxaso (born, 7 December 1957, San Sebastián) is a Spanish jurist, philosopher and Professor of Philosophy of Law at the Faculty of Law at the University of Zaragoza. She was appointed in January 2018 a judge at the European Court of Human Rights (ECHR).

Education 
Maria Elósegui graduated with a PhD from the University of Navarra in 1987 and followed up on her studies with a second master in philosophy at the University of Glasgow in 1989. Following this, she studied law at the University of Sain-Louis, Brussels, Belgium from where she graduated with a MSc in 1994. She obtained a Doctor of Juridical Science from the University of Navarra in 2002.

Professional career 
Between 1982 and 1988 she taught philosophy in Bilbao, and from 1988 to 1989 she researched at the Glasgow University. She became a Professor of Philosophy of Law at the University of Zaragoza in 1994 and lectured until 2018. She was also assigned as a member of the European Commission against Racism and Intolerance (ECRI) between 2013 and 2017. Since 2018, she has been the representative of Spain in the European Court of Human Rights, succeeding Luis López Guerra.

Controversies 
In 2018, she partly dissented with the rest of the ruling judges at the ECHR and stated in her opinion that an administrative or civil sanction against the public protest of the Pussy Riot would not be an undue interference with the applicants' freedom of expression. Pussy Riot had performed a protest performance at the Cathedral of Christ the Saviour in Moscow in 2012 against the return to power of Vladimir Putin. In her separate opinion, Elósegui concurred with the majority of judges that there had been several violations of the ECHR based on the Internet ban of the video, and that the criminal sanction applied to the Pussy Riot was excessive.

Publications 
During her career, she published numerous books concerning the rule of law, except the one about Peine del Viento.

Personal life 
Elósegui is the daughter of engineer José María Elósegui and a sister to the film director and documentary filmmaker José María Elósegui, who in 2008 released the documentary about the Peine del Viento, a well known sculpture in San Sebastian. Maria Elosegui also wrote a book about the sculpture to which her father collaborated as an engineer. Her sister, Dr. Lucía Elósegui, is the transplant coordinator to the University Hospital of San Sebastian. She is also a member of the Roman Catholic group Opus Dei.

References 

1957 births
20th-century essayists
20th-century Spanish non-fiction writers
20th-century Spanish philosophers
20th-century Spanish women writers
20th-century women lawyers
21st-century essayists
21st-century Spanish non-fiction writers
21st-century Spanish philosophers
21st-century Spanish women writers
21st-century women judges
21st-century women lawyers
Alumni of the University of Glasgow
Analytic philosophers
Catholic philosophers
Judges of the European Court of Human Rights
Living people
Opus Dei members
Philosophers of culture
Philosophers of law
Philosophers of religion
Philosophers of social science
Philosophy academics
Political philosophers
Spanish social commentators
Social philosophers
Spanish essayists
Spanish women judges
Spanish non-fiction writers
Spanish Roman Catholics
21st-century Spanish judges
University of Navarra alumni
Academic staff of the University of Zaragoza
Women legal scholars
Writers about activism and social change